Campbell Best (born 12 March 1986) is a footballer from Cook Islands. He plays as a midfielder for Puaikura in the Cook Islands Round Cup. He played for Cook Islands at 2014 FIFA World Cup qualifiers.

Career statistics

International

Statistics accurate as of match played 2 September 2015

International goals
Scores and results list. Cook Islands's goal tally first.

References

External links
 

1986 births
Living people
Cook Islands international footballers
Association football midfielders
Cook Island footballers